Ulysses G. Buzzard (January 31, 1865 – August 2, 1939) was an American soldier who served in the United States Army during the Spanish–American War and whose actions during that conflict led to him receiving the Medal of Honor for bravery.

Biography
Ulysses Grant Buzzard was born January 31, 1865, in Armstrong County, Pennsylvania. He joined the army from Pittsburgh, Pennsylvania, in May 1888, and served with Company C, 17th U.S. Infantry in the Spanish–American War. He later served in the Philippines, and retired there in December 1911.

Buzzard died at age 74 and was buried at San Nicolas Cemetery in Cebu City, the Philippines.

Medal of Honor citation
Rank and organization: Corporal, Company C, 17th U.S. Infantry. Place and date: At El Caney, Cuba, 1 July 1898. Entered service at: __. Birth: Armstrong, Pa. Date of issue: 24 June 1899.

Citation:

Gallantly assisted in the rescue of the wounded from in front of the lines and under heavy fire from the enemy.

See also

 List of Medal of Honor recipients for the Spanish–American War

References

External links
 

1865 births
1939 deaths
United States Army Medal of Honor recipients
United States Army soldiers
American military personnel of the Spanish–American War
People from Armstrong County, Pennsylvania
Military personnel from Pennsylvania
Spanish–American War recipients of the Medal of Honor